The Jodhpur–Delhi Sarai Rohilla Superfast Express is a Superfast Express train belonging to North Western Railway zone that runs between  and  in India. It is currently being operated with 22481/22482 train numbers on a daily basis.

Service

The 22481/Jodhpur–Delhi Sarai Rohilla Superfast Express has an average speed of 60 km/hr and covers  620 km in 10h 20m. The 22482/Delhi Sarai Rohilla–Jodhpur Superfast Express has an average speed of 58 km/hr and covers 620 km in 10h 45m.

Route & Halts 

The important halts of the train are:

Coach composition

The train has standard ICF rakes with max speed of 110 kmph. The train consists of 18 coaches:

 1 AC First Class
 1 AC II Tier
 4 AC III Tier
 10 Sleeper coaches
 6 General Unreserved
 2 Seating cum Luggage Rake

Traction

Both trains are hauled by a Bhagat Ki Kothi Loco Shed-based WDP-4 diesel locomotive from Jodhpur to Sarai Rohilla and vice versa.

Rake sharing

No rake sharing. Two dedicated rakes

See also 

 Delhi Sarai Rohilla railway station
 Jodhpur Junction railway station
 Bhagat Ki Kothi–Ahmedabad Weekly Express

Notes

References

External links 

 22482/Delhi Sarai Rohilla–Jodhpur Superfast Express India Rail Info
 22481/Jodhpur–Delhi Sarai Rohilla Superfast Express India Rail Info

Transport in Jodhpur
Transport in Delhi
Express trains in India
Rail transport in Delhi
Rail transport in Haryana
Rail transport in Rajasthan
Railway services introduced in 2014